Joshua Then and Now is a 1985 Canadian film and a TV mini-series, adapted by Mordecai Richler from his semi-autobiographical novel Joshua Then and Now.  James Woods starred as the adult Joshua, Gabrielle Lazure as his wife, and Alan Arkin as Joshua's father.  It was directed by Ted Kotcheff who had previously directed Richler's The Apprenticeship of Duddy Kravitz.

The film depicts Joshua growing up in his Montreal neighborhood, and then his adventures as a modestly successful writer.  He marries the "golden shiksa" of his dreams, but eventually everything around him crumbles and he must act quickly to recover it all.  A comedic drama, the film moves quickly without lingering for long on any incident and tells a connected complete narrative.  Alan Arkin is frequently noted in reviews for an outstanding performance.

The cast included Michael Sarrazin as Kevin Hornby (Pauline's brother), Robert Joy as Colin Fraser (Pauline's first husband), Linda Sorenson as Esther Shapiro (Joshua's mother), Alan Scarfe as Jack Trimble, Ken Campbell as Sidney Murdoch, Kate Trotter as Jane Trimble, Alexander Knox as Senator Hornby, and Eric Kimmel as young Joshua.  Filmed on location in Montreal, London, Brockville, and Ottawa, Ontario.  Rated R.  It has been transcribed to VHS (1986) and DVD-R (2016).

Plot
Joshua Shapiro, successful writer and pundit, in a hospital room, seems to have lost his wife and is in the middle of a sex scandal.  Compelled to find meaning in his life, he reviews it from his youth to the present day.

Joshua grew up as a Jew in the working class St. Urbain Street area in Montreal.  His upbringing was unusual because his father was a boxer who had become a gentle crook and his mother was a strip-tease dancer.  Embarrassingly, she strips for his friends as part of a Bar Mitzvah party for him. Joshua's father is revealed to have a unique perspective on life, sex, and religion.

A trip to Spain as a young man is the impetus that sparks a career as a journalist and writer.  In England in a momentary lapse of reason, Joshua forges letters about a (fake) homosexual affair with a British writer to sell to an American university archive.  He meets an upper-class Canadian married to a poseur of a communist and steals her away to become his own wife.  She is the daughter of a Canadian senator and Joshua's key into a level of society of which he is contemptuous.

In the meantime, Joshua's childhood friends have become successful in their own right.  Some become targets for bizarre pranks as he settles various scores.

Joshua's conceited brother-in-law assumes a pivotal role in the novel as it is revealed that he is insecure and vulnerable. Neighbors in the wealthy cottage community around Lake Memphremagog lead him astray with dreadful consequences. Past indiscretions rear their ugly heads and Joshua must put together the shambles of his life.

Cast
 James Woods - Joshua Shapiro
 Gabrielle Lazure - Pauline Shapiro
 Alan Arkin - Reuben Shapiro
 Michael Sarrazin - Kevin Hornby
 Linda Sorenson - Esther Shapiro
 Alan Scarfe - Jack Trimble
 Ken Campbell - Sidney Murdoch
 Kate Trotter - Jane Trimble
 Alexander Knox - Senator Hornby
 Eric Kimmel - Young Joshua Shapiro
 Chuck Shamata - Seymour Kaplan
 Yuval Kernerman - Young Seymour Kaplan
 Robert Joy - Colin Fraser
 Harvey Atkin - Dr. Jonathan Cole
 Paul Hecht - Eli Seligson
 Andrew Powell - Ralph Murdoch
 Jack Rider - Dr. Danzinger
 Talya Rubin - Susy Shapiro
 Robert Howard - Alex Shapiro
 Gordon Woolvett - Teddy Shapiro

Awards 
 Won five Genie Awards in 1986 including Best Supporting Actor (Arkin), Best Supporting Actress (Sorensen), Best Cinematography, Best Art Direction, and Best Costume Design.
 Nominated for 12 Genie awards 1986, including Best Picture, Best Director, and Best Screenplay.
 Canada's entry at the 1985 Cannes Film Festival.
 Santa Fe Film Festival, 5th (2004), Tributee Salutes section.

References

External links 
 
 
 

1985 films
Canadian comedy-drama films
1985 comedy-drama films
English-language Canadian films
Films directed by Ted Kotcheff
Films based on works by Mordecai Richler
Films based on Canadian novels
Films scored by Philippe Sarde
Jewish Canadian films
1980s English-language films
1980s Canadian films